These are lists of hat-tricks:

Cricket
 List of One Day International cricket hat-tricks
 List of hat-tricks in the Ranji Trophy
 List of Test cricket hat-tricks
 List of Twenty20 International cricket hat-tricks
 List of women's international cricket hat-tricks

Football

Club football
List of A-League Men hat-tricks
List of Allsvenskan hat-tricks
List of Brunei Super League hat-tricks
List of Bundesliga hat-tricks
List of AFC Champions League hat-tricks
List of CAF Champions League hat-tricks
List of Chinese Super League hat-tricks
List of CONCACAF Champions League hat-tricks
List of Conmebol Copa Libertadores hat-tricks
List of EFL Championship hat-tricks
List of EFL League One hat-tricks
List of EFL League Two hat-tricks
List of Egyptian Premier League hat-tricks
List of El Clásico hat-tricks
List of Eliteserien hat-tricks
List of Eredivisie hat-tricks
List of FA WSL hat-tricks
List of FIFA Club World Cup hat-tricks
List of Hong Kong Premier League hat-tricks
List of I-League hat-tricks
List of Indian Super League hat-tricks
List of Indian Women's League hat-tricks
List of Indonesia Super League hat-tricks
List of Intercontinental Cup hat-tricks
List of Iraqi Premier League hat-tricks
List of Kategoria Superiore hat-tricks
List of La Liga hat-tricks
List of Ligue 1 hat-tricks
List of Major League Soccer hat-tricks
List of National Women's Soccer League hat-tricks
List of OFC Champions League hat-tricks
List of Perú Liga 1 hat-tricks
List of Premier League hat-tricks
List of Premier Soccer League hat-tricks
List of Primeira Liga hat-tricks
List of Prva HNL hat-tricks
List of Saudi Professional League hat-tricks
List of Scottish Premier League hat-tricks
List of Scottish Professional Football League hat-tricks
List of Serie A hat-tricks
List of Tahiti Cup hat-tricks
List of Tahiti Ligue 1 hat-tricks
List of Tanzanian Premier League hat-tricks
List of TT Pro League hat-tricks
List of UEFA Champions League hat-tricks
List of UEFA Europa League hat-tricks
List of UEFA Super Cup hat-tricks

International football

List of AFC Asian Cup hat-tricks
List of AFF Championship hat-tricks
List of Africa Cup of Nations hat-tricks
List of Africa Women Cup of Nations hat-tricks
List of African Nations Championship hat-tricks
List of Australia national soccer team hat-tricks
List of Belgium national football team hat-tricks
List of Brazil national football team hat-tricks
List of Canada men's national soccer team hat-tricks
List of CONCACAF Championship hat-tricks
List of CONCACAF Gold Cup hat-tricks
List of Copa América hat-tricks
List of Croatia national football team hat-tricks
List of Denmark national football team hat-tricks
List of England national football team hat-tricks
List of FIFA Confederations Cup hat-tricks
List of FIFA Women's World Cup hat-tricks
List of FIFA World Cup hat-tricks
List of France national football team hat-tricks
List of Germany national football team hat-tricks
List of Hungary national football team hat-tricks
List of India national football team hat-tricks
List of India women's national football team hat-tricks
List of Iran national football team hat-tricks
List of Italy national football team hat-tricks
List of Japan national football team hat-tricks
List of North American Nations Cup hat-tricks
List of OFC Nations Cup hat-tricks
List of Philippines national football team hat-tricks
List of Portugal national football team hat-tricks
List of Republic of Ireland national football team hat-tricks
List of Romania national football team hat-tricks
List of Scotland national football team hat-tricks
List of South Africa national football team hat-tricks
List of Spain national football team hat-tricks
List of UEFA European Championship hat-tricks
List of United States men's national soccer team hat-tricks
List of United States women's national soccer team hat-tricks
List of Uruguay national football team hat-tricks
List of Wales national football team hat-tricks

Footballers

 List of hat-tricks scored by Lionel Messi
 List of hat-tricks scored by Cristiano Ronaldo
 List of international hat-tricks scored by Ali Daei
 List of international hat-tricks scored by Robert Lewandowski
 List of international hat-tricks scored by Lionel Messi
 List of international hat-tricks scored by Neymar
 List of international hat-tricks scored by Pelé
 List of international hat-tricks scored by Cristiano Ronaldo
 List of international hat-tricks scored by Sven Rydell
 List of international hat-tricks scored by Kelly Smith
 List of international hat-tricks scored by Ellen White

Hurling
List of All-Ireland Senior Hurling Championship hat-tricks

Rugby

Rugby league 

 List of Rugby League World Cup hat-tricks

Rugby union 

List of Rugby Union World Cup hat-tricks
List of Six Nations Championship hat-tricks

 
Lists of events lists